Viola is an unincorporated community in Gulich Township, Clearfield County, Pennsylvania, United States.

References

Unincorporated communities in Clearfield County, Pennsylvania
Unincorporated communities in Pennsylvania